Eustomias is a genus of barbeled dragonfishes native to the oceanic depths of the Indian, Atlantic and Pacific oceans.

Species
There are currently 117 recognized species in this genus:
 Eustomias achirus Parin & Pokhil'skaya, 1974 (Proud dragonfish)
 Eustomias acinosus Regan & Trewavas, 1930
 Eustomias aequatorialis T. A. Clarke, 1998
 Eustomias albibulbus T. A. Clarke, 2001
 Eustomias appositus Gibbs, T. A. Clarke & J. R. Gomon, 1983
 Eustomias arborifer A. E. Parr, 1927
 Eustomias australensis Gibbs, T. A. Clarke & J. R. Gomon, 1983 (Australian dragonfish)
 Eustomias austratlanticus Gibbs, T. A. Clarke & J. R. Gomon, 1983
 Eustomias bertelseni Gibbs, T. A. Clarke & J. R. Gomon, 1983
 Eustomias bibulboides Gibbs, T. A. Clarke & J. R. Gomon, 1983
 Eustomias bibulbosus A. E. Parr, 1927
 Eustomias bifilis Gibbs, 1960 (Twinthread dragonfish)
 Eustomias bigelowi W. W. Welsh, 1923
 Eustomias bimargaritatus Regan & Trewavas, 1930
 Eustomias bimargaritoides Gibbs, T. A. Clarke & J. R. Gomon, 1983
 Eustomias binghami A. E. Parr, 1927
 Eustomias bituberatus Regan & Trewavas, 1930
 Eustomias bituberoides Gibbs, T. A. Clarke & J. R. Gomon, 1983
 Eustomias borealis T. A. Clarke, 2000
 Eustomias braueri Zugmayer, 1911
 Eustomias brevibarbatus A. E. Parr, 1927
 Eustomias bulbiramis T. A. Clarke, 2001
 Eustomias bulbornatus Gibbs, 1960 (Grapevine dragonfish)
 Eustomias cancriensis Gibbs, T. A. Clarke & J. R. Gomon, 1983
 Eustomias cirritus Gibbs, T. A. Clarke & J. R. Gomon, 1983
 Eustomias contiguus J. R. Gomon & Gibbs, 1985
 Eustomias crossotus Gibbs, T. A. Clarke & J. R. Gomon, 1983
 Eustomias crucis Gibbs & Craddock, 1973
 Eustomias cryptobulbus T. A. Clarke, 2001 (Hiddenbulb dragonfish)
 Eustomias curtatus Gibbs, T. A. Clarke & J. R. Gomon, 1983
 Eustomias curtifilis T. A. Clarke, 2000
 Eustomias danae T. A. Clarke, 2001
 Eustomias decoratus Gibbs, 1971
 Eustomias dendriticus Regan & Trewavas, 1930
 Eustomias deofamiliaris Gibbs, T. A. Clarke & J. R. Gomon, 1983
 Eustomias digitatus J. R. Gomon & Gibbs, 1985
 Eustomias dinema T. A. Clarke, 1999
 Eustomias dispar J. R. Gomon & Gibbs, 1985
 Eustomias dubius A. E. Parr, 1927
 Eustomias elongatus T. A. Clarke, 2001
 Eustomias enbarbatus W. W. Welsh, 1923 (Barbate dragonfish)
 Eustomias filifer Gilchrist, 1906
 Eustomias fissibarbis Pappenheim, 1912
 Eustomias flagellifer T. A. Clarke, 2001
 Eustomias furcifer Regan & Trewavas, 1930
 Eustomias gibbsi R. K. Johnson & Rosenblatt, 1971
 Eustomias grandibulbus Gibbs, T. A. Clarke & J. R. Gomon, 1983
 Eustomias hulleyi J. R. Gomon & Gibbs, 1985
 Eustomias hypopsilus J. R. Gomon & Gibbs, 1985
 Eustomias ignotus J. R. Gomon & Gibbs, 1985
 Eustomias inconstans Gibbs, T. A. Clarke & J. R. Gomon, 1983
 Eustomias insularum T. A. Clarke, 1998
 Eustomias intermedius T. A. Clarke, 1998
 Eustomias interruptus T. A. Clarke, 1999
 Eustomias ioani Parin & Pokhil'skaya, 1974
 Eustomias jimcraddocki Sutton & Hartel, 2004
 Eustomias kikimora Prokofiev, 2015 
 Eustomias kreffti Gibbs, T. A. Clarke & J. R. Gomon, 1983
 Eustomias lanceolatus T. A. Clarke, 1999
 Eustomias leptobolus Regan & Trewavas, 1930
 Eustomias lipochirus Regan & Trewavas, 1930
 Eustomias longibarba A. E. Parr, 1927
 Eustomias longiramis T. A. Clarke, 2001
 Eustomias macronema Regan & Trewavas, 1930 (Bigbarb dragonfish)
 Eustomias macrophthalmus A. E. Parr, 1927
 Eustomias macrurus Regan & Trewavas, 1930 (Yellowstem dragonfish)
 Eustomias magnificus T. A. Clarke, 2001
 Eustomias medusa Gibbs, T. A. Clarke & J. R. Gomon, 1983
 Eustomias melanonema Regan & Trewavas, 1930
 Eustomias melanostigma Regan & Trewavas, 1930
 Eustomias melanostigmoides Gibbs, T. A. Clarke & J. R. Gomon, 1983
 Eustomias mesostenus Gibbs, T. A. Clarke & J. R. Gomon, 1983
 Eustomias metamelas J. R. Gomon & Gibbs, 1985
 Eustomias micraster A. E. Parr, 1927
 Eustomias micropterygius A. E. Parr, 1927
 Eustomias minimus T. A. Clarke, 1999
 Eustomias monoclonoides T. A. Clarke, 1999
 Eustomias monoclonus Regan & Trewavas, 1930
 Eustomias monodactylus Regan & Trewavas, 1930
 Eustomias multifilis Parin & Pokhil'skaya, 1978 (Multi-thread dragonfish)
 Eustomias obscurus Vaillant, 1884
 Eustomias orientalis Gibbs, T. A. Clarke & J. R. Gomon, 1983
 Eustomias pacificus Gibbs, T. A. Clarke & J. R. Gomon, 1983
 Eustomias parini T. A. Clarke, 2001 (Parin's dragonfish)
 Eustomias parri Regan & Trewavas, 1930
 Eustomias patulus Regan & Trewavas, 1930
 Eustomias paucifilis A. E. Parr, 1927
 Eustomias paxtoni T. A. Clarke, 2001
 Eustomias perplexus Gibbs, T. A. Clarke & J. R. Gomon, 1983
 Eustomias pinnatus T. A. Clarke, 1999
 Eustomias polyaster A. E. Parr, 1927
 Eustomias posti Gibbs, T. A. Clarke & J. R. Gomon, 1983
 Eustomias precarius J. R. Gomon & Gibbs, 1985
 Eustomias problematicus T. A. Clarke, 2001
 Eustomias pyrifer Regan & Trewavas, 1930
 Eustomias quadrifilis J. R. Gomon & Gibbs, 1985
 Eustomias radicifilis Borodin, 1930
 Eustomias satterleei Beebe, 1933 (Twinray dragonfish)
 Eustomias schiffi Beebe, 1932
 Eustomias schmidti Regan & Trewavas, 1930 (Schmidt's dragonfish)
 Eustomias silvescens Regan & Trewavas, 1930
 Eustomias similis Parin, 1978
 Eustomias simplex Regan & Trewavas, 1930
 Eustomias spherulifer Gibbs, T. A. Clarke & J. R. Gomon, 1983
 Eustomias suluensis Gibbs, T. A. Clarke & J. R. Gomon, 1983
 Eustomias tension Regan & Trewavas, 1930
 Eustomias tetranema Zugmayer, 1913
 Eustomias teuthidopsis Gibbs, T. A. Clarke & J. R. Gomon, 1983
 Eustomias tomentosis T. A. Clarke, 1998
 Eustomias trewavasae Norman, 1930 (Deepsea dragonfish)
 Eustomias triramis Regan & Trewavas, 1930
 Eustomias uniramis T. A. Clarke, 1999
 Eustomias variabilis Regan & Trewavas, 1930
 Eustomias vitiazi Parin & Pokhil'skaya, 1974 (Vitiaz dragonfish)
 Eustomias vulgaris T. A. Clarke, 2001 (Common dragonfish)
 Eustomias woollardi T. A. Clarke, 1998
 Eustomias xenobolus Regan & Trewavas, 1930

References

Stomiidae
Marine fish genera
Ray-finned fish genera
Taxa named by Léon Vaillant